Alberto Ismodes Dulanto (1910 – unknown), was a Peruvian chess player.

Biography
Alberto Ismodes Dulanto was one of the strongest Peruvian chess players of the 1930s (It was only from 1942 that the history of the official Peruvian Chess Championships began). Ismodes played for Peru in the 8th Chess Olympiad.

In the tournament, his match with Daniel Yanofsky was praised by World Chess Champion Alexander Alekhine for its quality.

 In 1939, at first board in the 8th Chess Olympiad in Buenos Aires (+1, =3, -11).

References

External links

Alberto Ismodes Dulanto chess games at 365chess.com

1910 births
Year of death missing
Peruvian chess players
Chess Olympiad competitors
20th-century chess players
20th-century Peruvian people